Frederick Sackville Boobyer (28 January 1928 – 24 March 2009) was an English professional golfer who played on the British circuit in the 1960s. Although he never won an important 72-hole tournament, he was good enough to be selected for the Professionals  against the Amateurs in 1960 and for the 6-man England team in the 1967 R.T.V. International Trophy, where he won 5 of his 6 matches and halved the other.

He won the 1966 36-hole pro-am Bowmaker Tournament at Sunningdale Golf Club, scoring 30 for the last 9 holes. He collected £350 for the win plus a further £50 for his second round 64 and another £250 for winning the pro-am where he was partnered by Bruce Forsyth.

In the 1981 PGA Seniors Championship at North Berwick Golf Club, he lost in a playoff to Christy O'Connor Snr, taking 5 to Christy's 4 at the first playoff hole.

His father Fred and brother Bob were also professional golfers.

Tournament wins
1964 West of England Professional Championship
1966 Bowmaker Tournament
1967 Woodlawn International Invitational
1974 West of England Professional Championship

Results in major championships

Note: Boobyer only played in The Open Championship.

CUT = missed the half-way cut (3rd round cut in 1968 and 1970 Open Championships)
"T" indicates a tie for a place

Team appearances
Amateurs–Professionals Match (representing the Professionals): 1960 (winners)
R.T.V. International Trophy (representing England): 1967 (winners)

References

External links

English male golfers
European Tour golfers
People from North Somerset (district)
Sportspeople from Bristol
1928 births
2009 deaths